The Labour Movement for Europe (LME) is the only pro-EU society affiliated to the Labour Party in the United Kingdom. It is one of 20 "socialist societies" affiliated to the UK Labour Party, just like the Fabians and The Jewish Labour Movement. 

The society campaigns on European issues within the Labour Party, supporting UK membership of the EU prior to Brexit and reform of the EU. During the 2016 United Kingdom European Union membership referendum it made a left-wing case for Remain and until the December 2019 general election result argued there should be a "people's vote" between Remain and the final Brexit deal negotiated by the government, in which the Labour Party should argue passionately and clearly to Remain within the EU. Now that Brexit has happened, it campaigns for the next Labour government to negotiate the closest possible relationship with the EU .

In the 2020 Labour leadership and deputy leadership elections, the LME endorsed Keir Starmer and Ian Murray for Leader and Deputy respectively. Chair of the LME at the time, Anna Turley commented that it was "because of their strong pro-EU values and the fact that we think they are in the best place to take Labour to victory at the next election."

Originally set up in the early 1960s as the Labour Committee for Europe, it split in 1981 when some of its prominent members (notably Roy Jenkins, Shirley Williams and Bill Rodgers) left Labour to found the SDP. Those remaining re-named the organisation Labour Movement for Europe and made a left wing case for Europe, remaining within the Labour Party.

Over recent years, its Chairs have included Bill Rammell, Chris Bryant, Mary Creagh, Richard Corbett, Clare Moody, and Anna Turley. The current chair is Stella Creasy.

Current executive 

Chair: Stella Creasy, Labour MP for Walthamstow

Honorary President: Neil Kinnock, former Labour leader (1983-1992), Vice-President of the European Commission (1999-2004), Labour peer since 2005

Vice Presidents: Baroness Jan Royall, former Leader of the House of Lords, Labour peer since 2004

Vice Presidents: Richard Corbett, the last UK Labour leader in the EU Parliament (2017-2020), Labour MEP from 1996-2009 and then again from 2014-2020. From 2010-2014 Corbett was an advisor to the first full-time and long-term President of the European Council, Herman Van Rompuy.

General Secretary: Giampi Alhadeff, former General Secretary for the European Parliamentary Labour Party (2006-2012)

References

External links
 Official website: 

Labour Party (UK) socialist societies
Organisations based in the City of Westminster